The 2012–13 Nemzeti Bajnokság I, also known as NB I, was the 111th season of top-tier football in Hungary. The league is officially named OTP Bank Liga for sponsorship reasons. The season began 27 July 2012 and ended on 2 June 2013. Debrecen were the defending champions having won their sixth Hungarian championship last season.

Teams
Zalaegerszegi TE and Vasas SC finished the 2011–12 season in the last two places and thus were relegated to their respective NB II divisions.

The two relegated teams were replaced with the champions of the two 2011–12 NB II groups, Eger of the East Group and MTK of the West Group. MTK made their immediate comeback to the league, while Eger returned to the competition for the first time since the 1986–87 season.

Stadia and locations

Following is the list of clubs competing in 2012–13 Nemzeti Bajnokság I, with their location, stadium and stadium capacity.

Personnel and kits
Following is the list of clubs competing in 2012–13 Nemzeti Bajnokság I, with their manager, captain, kit manufacturer and shirt sponsor.

Note: Flags indicate national team as has been defined under FIFA eligibility rules. Players and Managers may hold more than one non-FIFA nationality.

Managerial changes

Notes
2 Between 1 and 30 August Csaba Máté was the caretaker manager of Paks.
3 Between 27 August and 1 September László Kovács was the caretaker manager of Pápa.
4 Between 17 and 28 September István Szabó was the caretaker manager of Kecskemét.

League table

Positions by round

Results

Top goalscorers
Including matches played on 1 June 2013; Source: MLSZ

Hat-tricks 

4 Player scored 4 goals

Attendance

Top 15 attendances (single match)

Source:

NB1 attendances (average)

Source:

Last updated: 4 April 2013

References

External links
  

Nemzeti Bajnokság I seasons
1
Hungary